MissMatch is a Swedish electronica band consisting of Carin Ekroth and Emma Göransson. The group received increased exposure in 2007 when they entered the Melodifestivalen 2007 with the song "Drop Dead". Shortly after the contest they released their debut album Just Push Play Single number two is the upbeat pop Balad "Breathe in/Breathe out" and it is released in Sweden on September 7. The group has got great reviews, especially from the UK.

References

External links
MissMatch website
Review on MissMatch album Just Push Play
MissMatch on Myspace

Swedish electronic music groups
Melodifestivalen contestants of 2007
Melodifestivalen contestants of 2006